"Windy" is a pop music song written by Ruthann Friedman and recorded by the Association. The song reached No. 1 on the Billboard Hot 100 in July 1967, becoming the group's second U.S. No. 1 hit following "Cherish" in 1966. Billboard ranked the record as the No. 4 song for 1967. The lead vocals were sung primarily by guitarist and new band memberLarry Ramos along with vocalist Russ Giguere (both would sing lead together in the band's last Top 40 hit "Time for Livin').

Composition
Friedman was introduced to the Association by her friend and Beach Boys lyricist Van Dyke Parks. She wrote "Windy" in waltz time, but the group's producer Bones Howe changed its time signature to the more common  to ensure the song's commercial appeal. 

Friedman had written the song about a man but the Association changed the gender in the lyrics. In an interview with Songfacts, she said:

However, in another interview with Songfacts in 2014, she explained that the song was about herself:

Recording
The process of recording the vocals was exhausting. The session started in the early afternoon and ended at 6:30 a.m. the next day, and the group then took an 8:30 a.m. flight to a live performance in Virginia. The band was so tired of recording that producer Bones Howe gathered everyone in the studio to sing the track's ending, including songwriter Ruthann Friedman.

Because of the poor sales of the Association's last album Renaissance, on which the group performed all of the songs, Howe recruited session musicians (later known as the Wrecking Crew) for "Windy" and the rest of the Insight Out album in order to achieve a radio-friendly sound. The identity of the session musicians who played on the final version of the single is uncertain because the song was recorded during several sessions, but it is likely that Hal Blaine played drums, Joe Osborn played bass, Ray Pohlman played guitar and Larry Knechtel played keyboards.

Personnel
According to the AFM contract sheet, the following musicians played on the track.

Ray Pohlman
Hal Blaine
Dennis Budimir
Al Casey
Mike Deasy
Bones Howe
Larry Knechtel
Joe Osborn
Gary Coleman
Bill Holman
Bud Shank
Gene Cipriano
Vincent DeRosa
Richard Perissi

Chart history

Weekly charts

Year-end charts

All-time charts

Notable cover versions
Later in 1967, an instrumental version by jazz guitarist Wes Montgomery became his highest-charting Hot 100 hit when it peaked at No. 44. It also reached No. 10 on the Billboard Easy Listening chart.

See also
List of recordings of songs featuring Hal Blaine

Notes

References

External links
 

1967 singles
The Association songs
Gary Lewis & the Playboys songs
Barry Manilow songs
Andy Williams songs
Billboard Hot 100 number-one singles
Cashbox number-one singles
1967 songs
Warner Records singles
Song recordings produced by Bones Howe
RPM Top Singles number-one singles